Penrhos College is an independent Uniting Church single-sex primary and secondary day and boarding school for girls, located in Como, a southern suburb of Perth, Western Australia.

Founded in 1952 as the Methodist Ladies' College, South Perth, Penrhos has a non-selective enrolment policy and currently caters for approximately 1,400 students from Kindergarten to Year 12, including 105 boarders in Years 7 to 12.

The college is affiliated with the Association of Heads of Independent Schools of Australia (AHISA), the Junior School Heads Association of Australia (JSHAA), the Australian Boarding Schools' Association (ABSA), the Alliance of Girls' Schools Australasia (AGSA), and is a member of the Independent Girls Schools Sports Association (IGSSA). The school takes pride in its 17 consecutive wins in the IGSSA athletics, and almost as many in the cross country and swimming events.

History
Penrhos College was established in 1952 as the Methodist Ladies' College, South Perth and was originally located on Angelo St, South Perth across from the Perth Zoo. The school moved to its present site in Como, six kilometres south of Perth, in 1971. The school was originally a subdivision of the Methodist Ladies' College, Claremont (1907), but both now operate independently. It educates from pre-kindergarten to year 12.

In 1977, the Methodist Ladies' College, South Perth was awarded to the Uniting Church in Australia following Church Union, and became known as Penrhos College. The school's new name was drawn from Penrhos College, in Colwyn Bay, North Wales, which was established in 1880 by the Methodist Church, for the special education of girls. Penrhos is a Welsh word meaning "Peak of the Moor".

Campus
Penrhos College is situated on a single suburban campus in an elevated position, on a former pine plantation.

Academics

The school has had consistently good WACE results and appears regularly in the top 30 schools for the WACE.

Alumni 
Alumni of Penrhos College are known as Old Girls and may elect to join the school's alumni association, The Penrhos College Alumni Inc. Some notable Penrhos Old Girls include:

 Kate Atkinson – actress
 Amber Bradley – rower; world champion and Olympian
 Haylie Ecker – first violin of classical string quartet 'Bond'
 Tessa Parkinson – sailor; competed in Olympics 
 Amanda Platell – journalist and television presenter
 Rabia Siddique – international humanitarian and criminal lawyer, terrorism prosecutor, former senior officer in the British Army, professional public speaker, author
 Zoe Ventoura – actress
 Maddie Phillips – actress

See also 

 List of schools in the Perth metropolitan area
 List of boarding schools in Australia
 Methodism

References

External links 
Penrhos College

Girls' schools in Western Australia
Educational institutions established in 1952
Former Methodist schools in Australia
Uniting Church schools in Australia
Boarding schools in Western Australia
Private primary schools in Perth, Western Australia
Junior School Heads Association of Australia Member Schools in Western Australia
Private secondary schools in Perth, Western Australia
1952 establishments in Australia
Como, Western Australia
Alliance of Girls' Schools Australasia